Asawase is one of the constituencies represented in the Parliament of Ghana. It elects one Member of Parliament (MP) by the first past the post system of election, Asawase is famous for being a stronghold for NDC in the Ashanti Region. Asawase is located in the Kumasi Metropolitan district  of the Ashanti Region of Ghana.

This seat was created prior to the  Ghanaian parliamentary election in 2004 and has since been held by the National Democratic Congress.

Boundaries
The seat is located within the Kumasi Metropolitan District of the Ashanti Region of Ghana.

History 
The constituency was formed in 2004 by the Electoral Commission of Ghana along with 29 other new ones, increasing the number of constituencies from 200 to 230. The Asokwa East and Asokwa West constituencies were realigned, forming the Asawase (Asokwa) constituency and the new Oforikrom constituency.

Members of Parliament

Elections

 
 
 
 
 
 
  

A by-election was held following the death of the incumbent MP, Dr. Gibril. Muntaka Mohammed Mubarak won with a majority of 11,142 replacing the late Dr Gibrine also of the NDC who had won the seat in December 2004 with a majority of 4,474. The Ghana Center for Democratic Development deemed that this by-election was "fair and transparent, but not free from fear." He subsequently retained his seat in the Ghanaian parliamentary election held in December 2008.

See also
List of Ghana Parliament constituencies

References 

Parliamentary constituencies in the Ashanti Region
2004 establishments in Ghana